John Latey may refer to:

 John Latey (journalist) (1842–1902), British journalist and writer
 John Latey (judge) (1914–1999), British judge